Abraham Aaron Roback (1890–1965) was a Jewish American psychologist and promoter of Yiddish.

Life
A. A. Roback was born on 19 June 1890 in Goniondz, Russian Empire (now Poland). He was the youngest of four children of Isaac Roback and Leba Rahver. The family emigrated to Montreal in 1892, where he attended public schools. He graduated from McGill University in 1912, having studied philosophy with J.W.A. Hickson and experimental psychology with William Dunlop Tait. He studied for a PhD under Hugo Münsterberg at Harvard University, where he later taught for several years. He also taught at the University of Pittsburgh, Northeastern University, Clark University and Massachusetts Institute of Technology.

Roback built a 10,000 volume Yiddish library for Harvard, and in 1929 introduced the first US academic course in Yiddish literature for the Massachusetts University Extension. He died in Cambridge, Massachusetts on June 7, 1965.

References

External links

Abraham Aaron Roback papers (MS Am 2518) at Houghton Library, Harcard University, Cambridge, MA
Abraham Aaron Roback papers (RG 596) at the YIVO Institute for Jewish Research, New York, NY
Abraham Aaron Roback collection at the Canadian Jewish Archives

20th-century American psychologists
Yiddish culture in the United States
Harvard University alumni
History of YIVO
1890 births
1965 deaths
McGill University alumni